was a legendary prince of Silla who settled in Japan during the era of Emperor Suinin, around the 3rd or 4th century and was said to have lived in Tajima Province. His descendants are the Tajima clan. Amenohiboko is the ancestral god of Tajima Province and is supposedly enshrined in the Shinto Shrine (Izushi jinja) at Toyooka in Hyōgo Prefecture.

Seven or eight treasures brought by Amenohiboko are thought to be housed in Izushi Shrine in Hyōgo Prefecture.

According to the Nihon Shoki, "In Kagami Village, Omi Province, there was a craftsman of Suebe who served the prince of Silla, Amenohiboko, who came to Japan." However, at present, early Sueki was not found at Kagamiyama ruins of old kilns in Ryuocho, Shiga Prefecture, which is closely linked to this description, or either in Tajima region where Amenohiboko is said to have lived. Amenohiboko is attributed, in legend, some parts of Toyooka City.

Notes

Silla people
Deified Japanese people
Deified Japanese people in the Kiki